Bride kidnapping, also known as marriage by abduction or marriage by capture, is a practice in which a man abducts the woman he wishes to marry.

Bride kidnapping (hence the portmanteau bridenapping) has been practiced around the world and throughout prehistory and history, among peoples as diverse as the Hmong in Southeast Asia, African Tribes, the Tzeltal in Mexico, and the Romani in Europe. Bride kidnapping still occurs in various parts of the world, but it is most common in the Caucasus and Central Asia.

In most nations, bride kidnapping is considered a sex crime because of the implied element of rape, rather than a valid form of marriage. Some types of it may also be seen as falling along the continuum between forced marriage and arranged marriage. The term is sometimes confused with elopements, in which a couple runs away together and seeks the consent of their parents later. In some cases, the woman cooperates with or accedes to the kidnapping, typically in an effort to save face for herself or her parents. In many jurisdictions, this used to be encouraged by so-called marry-your-rapist laws. Even in countries where the practice is against the law, if judicial enforcement is weak, customary law ("traditional practices") may prevail.

Bride kidnapping is often (but not always) a form of child marriage. It may be connected to the practice of bride price, wealth paid by the groom and his family to the bride's parents, and the inability or unwillingness to pay it.

Bride kidnapping is distinguished from raptio in that the former refers to the abduction of one woman by one man (and his friends and relatives), and is still a widespread practice, whereas the latter refers to the large scale abduction of women by groups of men, possibly in a time of war. Raptio was assumed to be a historical practice, hence the Latin term, but the 21st century has seen a resurgence of war rape, some of which has elements of bride kidnapping; for example, women and girls abducted by Boko Haram in Nigeria, the Lord's Resistance Army in Uganda and ISIS in the Middle East have been taken as wives by their abductors.

Rituals indicating a symbolic bride kidnapping still exist in some cultures (such as Circassians), as part of traditions surrounding a wedding. According to some sources, the honeymoon is a relic of marriage by capture, based on the practice of the husband going into hiding with his wife to avoid reprisals from her relatives, with the intention that the woman would be pregnant by the end of the month.

Background and rationale 

Though the motivations behind bride kidnapping vary by region, the cultures with traditions of marriage by abduction are generally patriarchal with a strong social stigma on sex or pregnancy outside marriage and illegitimate births. 
In some modern cases, the couple colluded to elope under the guise of a bride kidnapping, presenting their parents with a fait accompli. In most cases, however, the men who resort to capturing a wife are often of lower social status, because of poverty, disease, poor character or criminality. They are sometimes deterred from legitimately seeking a wife because of the payment the woman's family expects, the bride price (not to be confused with a dowry, paid by the woman's family).

In agricultural and patriarchal societies, where bride kidnapping is most common, children work for their families.  A woman leaves her birth family, geographically and economically, when she marries, becoming instead a member of the groom's family.  (See patrilocality for an anthropological explanation.) Due to this loss of labour, the women's families do not want their daughters to marry young, and demand economic compensation (the aforementioned bride price) when they do leave them. This conflicts with the interests of men, who want to marry early, as marriage means an increase in social status, and the interests of the groom's family, who will gain another pair of hands for the family farm, business or home. Depending on the legal system under which she lives, the consent of the woman may not be a factor in judging the validity of the marriage.

In addition to the issue of forced marriage, bride kidnapping may have other negative effects on young women and their society. For example, fear of kidnap is cited as a reason for the lower participation of girls in the education system.

The mechanism of marriage by abduction varies by location. This article surveys the phenomenon by region, drawing on common cultural factors for patterns, but noting country-level distinctions.

Africa

Egypt
There have been cases of Coptic Christian women and girls abducted, forced to convert to Islam and then married to Muslim men. The practice has increased with the rise of Salafist networks under president Abdel Fattah Saeed Hussein Khalil el-Sisi, who pay as much as $3000 for every Coptic Christian woman kidnapped, raped and married to a Muslim man.

Ethiopia
Bride kidnapping is prevalent in many regions of Ethiopia.  According to surveys conducted in 2003 by the National Committee on Traditional Practices in Ethiopia, the custom's prevalence rate was estimated at 69 percent nationally, and highest in the Southern Nations, Nationalities and People's Region at 92 percent. A man working in co-ordination with his friends may kidnap a girl or woman, sometimes using a horse to ease the escape. The abductor will then hide his intended bride or bring her to his family and rape her, sometimes in front of his family, until she becomes pregnant. As the father of the woman's child, the man can claim her as his wife. Subsequently, the kidnapper may try to negotiate a bride price with the village elders to legitimize the marriage. Girls as young as eleven years old are reported to have been kidnapped for the purpose of marriage. Though Ethiopia criminalised such abductions and raised the marriageable age to 18 in 2004, the law has not been well implemented. A 2016 UNICEF evidence review (based on data from 2010 and 2013) estimated that 10 to 13 percent of marriages in the highest risk areas involved abduction, with rates of 1.4 percent to 2.4 percent in lower risk areas of the country.

The bride of the forced marriage may suffer from the psychological and physical consequences of forced sexual activity and early pregnancy and the early end to her education. Women and girls who are kidnapped may also be exposed to sexually transmitted diseases such as HIV/AIDS.

Kenya
Forced marriages continue to be a problem for young girls in Kenya. The United States Department of State reports that children and young teenaged girls (aged ten and up) are sometimes married to men two decades older.

Marriage by abduction used to be, and to some extent still is, a customary practice for the Kisii ethnic group. In their practice, the abductor kidnaps the woman forcibly and rapes her in an attempt to impregnate her. The "bride" is then coerced through the stigma of pregnancy and rape to marry her abductor. Though most common in the late 19th century through the 1960s, such marriage abductions still occur occasionally.

The Turkana tribe also practised marriage by abduction. In this culture, bridal kidnapping (akomari) occurred before any formal attempts to arrange a marriage with a bride's family. According to one scholar, a successful bridal kidnapping raised the abductor's reputation in his community, and allowed him to negotiate a lower bride price with his wife's family. Should an attempted abductor fail to seize his bride, he was bound to pay a bride price to the woman's family, provide additional gifts and payments to the family, and to have an arranged marriage (akota).

Rwanda

Bride-kidnapping is prevalent in areas of Rwanda. Often the abductor kidnaps the woman from her household or follows her outside and abducts her. He and his companions may then rape the woman to ensure that she submits to the marriage. The family of the woman either then feels obliged to consent to the union, or is forced to when the kidnapper impregnates her, as pregnant women are not seen as eligible for marriage. The marriage is confirmed with a ceremony that follows the abduction by several days. In such ceremonies, the abductor asks his bride's parents to forgive him for abducting their daughter. The man may offer a cow, money, or other goods as restitution to his bride's family.

Bride-kidnap marriages in Rwanda often lead to poor outcomes. Human rights workers report that one third of men who abduct their wives abandon them, leaving the wife without support and impaired in finding a future marriage. Additionally, with the growing frequency of bride-kidnapping, some men choose not to solemnize their marriage at all, keeping their "bride" as a concubine.

Bride kidnapping is not specifically outlawed in Rwanda, though violent abductions are punishable as rape. According to a criminal justice official, bride kidnappers are virtually never tried in court: "When we hear about abduction, we hunt down the kidnappers and arrest them and sometimes the husband, too. But we're forced to let them all go several days later," says an official at the criminal investigation department in Nyagatare, the capital of Umutara. Women's rights groups have attempted to reverse the tradition by conducting awareness raising campaigns and by promoting gender equity, but the progress has been limited so far.

South Africa
The practice is known as ukuthwalwa or simply thwala in the Nguni-speaking tribes. (The Basotho call it tjhobediso.) Among Zulu people, thwala was once an acceptable way for two young people in love to get married when their families opposed the match, and so it was actually a form of elopement. Thwala has been abused, however, "to victimize isolated rural women and enrich male relatives."

Central Asia 

In Central Asia, bride kidnapping exists in Kyrgyzstan, Kazakhstan, Turkmenistan, and Karakalpakstan, an autonomous region of Uzbekistan. Though origin of the tradition in the region is disputed, the rate of nonconsensual bride kidnappings appears to be increasing in several countries throughout Central Asia as the political and economic climate changes.

Kyrgyzstan 

Despite its illegality, with the practice being subjected to stricter crackdowns in 2013, which punish it by a prison sentences of up to 10 years,  in many primarily rural areas, bride kidnapping, known as ala kachuu (to take and flee), is an accepted and common way of taking a wife. The matter is somewhat confused by the local use of the term "bride kidnap" to reflect practices along a continuum, from forcible abduction and rape (and then, almost unavoidably, marriage), to something akin to an elopement arranged between the two young people, to which both sets of parents have to consent after the act. Bride kidnappings that involve rape do so to psychologically force the would-be bride to accept her kidnapper and his family's pressure to marry him, since if she then refuses she would never be considered marriageable again. Of 12,000 yearly bride kidnappings, approximately 2,000 women reported that she had been raped by the would-be groom. However, the United Nations Development Programme disputes that bride kidnapping is part of the country's culture or tradition, and considers it a human rights violation.

Estimates of the prevalence of bride kidnapping vary, sometimes widely. A 2015 crime victimization survey included the kidnapping of young women for marriage. Fourteen percent of married women answered that they had been kidnapped; two-thirds of these cases had been consensual, in that the woman knew the man and had agreed with it up front. This means that about five percent of extant marriages are cases of Ala Kachuu. A 2007 study published in the Central Asian Survey concluded that approximately half of all Kyrgyz marriages included bride kidnapping; of those kidnappings, two-thirds are non-consensual. Research by non-governmental organizations give estimates from a low of 40% to between 68 and 75 percent.

Although the practice is illegal, bride kidnappers are rarely prosecuted. This reluctance to enforce the code is in part caused by the pluralistic legal system, where many villages are de facto ruled by councils of elders and aqsaqal courts following customary law, away from the eyes of the state legal system. Aqsaqal courts, tasked with adjudicating family law, property and torts, often fail to take bride kidnapping seriously. In many cases, aqsaqal members are invited to the kidnapped bride's wedding and encourage the family of the bride to accept the marriage.

Kazakhstan

In Kazakhstan, bride kidnapping (alyp qashu) is divided into non-consensual and consensual abductions, kelisimsiz alyp qashu ("to take and run without agreement") and kelissimmen alyp qashu ("to take and run with agreement"), respectively. Though some kidnappers are motivated by the wish to avoid a bride price or the expense of hosting wedding celebrations or a feast to celebrate the girl leaving home, other would-be husbands fear the woman's refusal, or that the woman will be kidnapped by another suitor first. Generally, in nonconsensual kidnappings, the abductor uses either deception (such as offering a ride home) or force (such as grabbing the woman, or using a sack to restrain her) to coerce the woman to come with him. Once at the man's house, one of his female relatives offers the woman a kerchief (oramal) that signals the bride's consent to the marriage. Though in consensual kidnappings, the woman may agree with little hesitation to wear the kerchief, in non-consensual abductions, the woman may resist the kerchief for days. Next, the abductor's family generally asks the "bride" to write a letter to her family, explaining that she had been taken of her own free will. As with the kerchief, the woman may resist this step adamantly. Subsequently, the "groom" and his family generally issues an official apology to the bride's family, including a letter and a delegation from the groom's household. At this time, the groom's family may present a small sum to replace the bride-price. Though some apology delegations are met cordially, others are greeted with anger and violence. Following the apology delegation, the bride's family may send a delegation of "pursuers" (qughysnshy) either to retrieve the bride or to verify her condition and honour the marriage.

A recent victimization survey in Kazakhstan (2018) included the crime of kidnapping of young women for marriage. 4% of married women answered that they were kidnapped at the time and that two-thirds of these cases were consensual, the woman knew the man and had agreed with it up front. This means that about 1-1.5% of current marriages in Kazakhstan are the result of non-consensual abductions.

Uzbekistan

In Karakalpakstan, an autonomous region in Uzbekistan, nearly one fifth of all marriages are conducted by bride kidnapping. Activist groups in the region tie an increase in kidnappings to economic instability. Whereas weddings can be prohibitively expensive, kidnappings avoid both the cost of the ceremony and any bride price. Other scholars report that less desirable males with lower education level or suffering from drug abuse or alcoholism are more likely to kidnap their brides. Bride kidnapping sometimes originates out of a dating relationship and, at other times, happens as an abduction by multiple people.

East and South Asia

Pakistan

There are instances in which Hindu women and some Christian women and minor girls are forced to marry Muslim men. Many of these convert, either willingly or by force.

Indonesia 

In Bali tradition, Ngerorod is the tradition of abducting women for marrying when the caste of the man is lower than the woman. as the balinese caste order -from higher to lower- is: 1. Brahmanas 2. Satrias 3. Wesias 4. Sudras. The process from 'kidnapping' to marriage ritual usually done in 3 steps (usually completed in 3 days):

 Kidnapping the woman
 Sending messenger to inform the woman family
 The marriage

After the marriage, the woman is should change or remove her name prefix which is reflecting her caste before the marriage. On modern days, this practice is still going on with more permissive manner, like the woman parents know in advance when the kidnapping will happens, when the messenger will come, and when and where the marriage will take place.

This tradition is also practiced by Balinese not living in Bali: Balinese living in Lombok island, Balinese living in Lampung, etc.

The Sasak ethnic in Lombok island is also having Merariq tradition,

Hmong culture 
Marriage by abduction also occurs in traditional Hmong culture, in which it is known as zij poj niam. As in some other cultures, bride kidnapping is generally a joint effort between the would-be groom and his friends and family. Generally, the abductor takes the woman while she is alone. The abductor then sends a message to the kidnap victim's family, informing them of the abduction and the abductor's intent to marry their daughter. If the victim's family manage to find the woman and insist on her return, they might be able to free her from the obligation to marry the man. However, if they fail to find the woman, the kidnap victim is forced to marry the man. The abductor still has to pay a bride price for the woman, generally an increased amount because of the kidnapping. Because of this increased cost (and the general unpleasantness of abduction), kidnapping is usually only a practice reserved for a man with an otherwise blemished chance of securing a bride, because of criminal background, illness or poverty.

Occasionally, members of the Hmong ethnic group have engaged in bride kidnapping in the United States. In some cases, the defendant has been allowed to plead a cultural defense to justify his abduction. This defense has sometimes been successful. In 1985, Kong Moua, a Hmong man, kidnapped and raped a woman from a Californian college. He later claimed that this was an act of zij poj niam and was allowed to plead to false imprisonment only, instead of kidnapping and rape. The judge in this case considered cultural testimony as an explanation of the man's crime.

China
Until the 1940s, marriage by abduction, known as qiangqin, occurred in rural areas of China. Though illegal in imperial China, for rural areas it often became a local "institution". According to one scholar, marriage by abduction was sometimes a groom's answer to avoid paying a bride price. In other cases, the scholar argues, it was a collusive act between the bride's parents and the groom to circumvent the bride's consent.

Chinese scholars theorise that this practice of marriage by abduction became the inspiration for a form of institutionalised public expression for women: the bridal lament. In imperial China, a new bride performed a two- to three-day public song, including chanting and sobbing, that listed her woes and complaints. The bridal lament would be witnessed by members of her family and the local community.

In recent years bride kidnapping has resurfaced in areas of China. In many cases, the women are kidnapped and sold to men in poorer regions of China, or as far abroad as Mongolia. Reports say that buying a kidnapped bride is nearly one tenth of the price of hosting a traditional wedding. The United States Department of State tie this trend of abducting brides to China's one-child policy, and the consequent gender imbalance as more male children are born than female children.

Bride abduction also occurred in Tibetan history, sometimes involving ceremonial mock abductions or as a bargaining procedure.

Japan
According to a study conducted by Kunio Yanagita, a scholar of Folklore in Japan, three patterns of bride kidnapping are known to have existed in Japan:
 A man and his cooperators kidnap a woman without notifying her parents;
 Bride kidnapping that may occur after parents forbid marriage out of fear for their daughter's social reputation;
 Bride kidnapping as an alternative path to marriage for couples unable to pay for a typical wedding.

In Buraku of Kochi, there was the custom of bride kidnapping named katagu (かたぐ).

The Americas
The practice of kidnapping children, teenagers and women from neighbouring tribes and adopting them into the new tribe was common among Indigenous peoples of the Americas. The kidnappings were a way of introducing new blood into the group. Captured European women sometimes settled down as adopted members of the tribe and at least one woman, Mary Jemison, refused rescue when it was offered.

Brazil

The trope of the captured Indigenous (great, great) grandmother is a standard origin myth for many white Brazilian families, captured in the  widely use phrase "my (great, great) grandmother was an Indian caught in the rope" (the phrase Índia pega no laço). The phrase reflect "in part" the facts of centuries of female abductions by colonialists that continued even into the 20th century.  For example, in a paper discussing the phrase, Indigenous academic Mirna P Marinho da Silva Anaquiri reports a quote from a teacher in Goiânia interviewed as part of her fieldwork:

Helena Valero, a Brazilian woman kidnapped by Amazonian Indians in 1937, dictated her story to an Italian anthropologist, who published it in 1965.

United States
Cases exist within some Mormon Fundamentalist communities around the Utah-Arizona border; however, accurate information is difficult to obtain from these closed communities. Most of these cases are usually referred to as forced marriages, although they are similar to other bride kidnappings around the world.

Mexico

Among the Tzeltal community, a Mayan tribe in Chiapas, Mexico, bride kidnapping has been a recurring method of securing a wife. The Tzeltal people are an indigenous, agricultural tribe that is organised patriarchally. Premarital contact between the sexes is discouraged; unmarried women are supposed to avoid speaking with men outside their families. As with other societies, the grooms that engage in bride kidnapping have generally been the less socially desirable mates.

In the Tzeltal tradition, a girl is kidnapped by the groom, possibly in concert with his friends. She is generally taken to the mountains and raped. The abductor and his future bride often then stay with a relative until the bride's father's anger is reported to have subsided. At that point, the abductor will return to the bride's house to negotiate a bride-price, bringing with him the bride and traditional gifts such as rum.

The largest Comanche raids into Mexico took place from 1840 to the mid-1850s, when they declined in size and intensity. The captured Mexican girls often became one of several wives of Comanche men.

Chile

Among the Mapuche of Chile, the practice was known as casamiento por capto in Spanish, and ngapitun in Mapudungun. Contemporary chronicler Alonso González de Nájera writes that during the Destruction of the Seven Cities in southern Chile Mapuches took over 500 Spanish women as captives. In the case of the women it was, in the words of González de Nájera, "to exploit them". The capture of women initiated a tradition of abductions of Spanish women in the 17th century by Mapuches.

The Caucasus 

Bride kidnapping is an increasing trend in the countries and regions of the Caucasus, both in Georgia in the South and in Dagestan, Chechnya and Ingushetia in the North. In the Caucasian versions of bride-kidnapping, the kidnap victim's family may play a role in attempting to convince the woman to stay with her abductor after the kidnapping, because of the shame inherent in the presumed consummation of the marriage.

Dagestan, Chechnya and Ingushetia

The Dagestan, Chechnya and Ingushetia regions in the Northern Caucasus (in Russia) have also witnessed an increase in bride kidnappings since the fall of the Soviet Union. As in other countries, kidnappers sometimes seize acquaintances to be brides and other times abduct strangers. The social stigma of spending a night in a male's house can be a sufficient motivation to force a young woman to marry her captor. Under Russian law, though a kidnapper who refuses to release his bride could be sentenced to eight to ten years, a kidnapper will not be prosecuted if he releases the victim or marries her with her consent. Bride captors in Chechnya are liable, in theory, to receive also a fine of up to 1 million rubles. As in the other regions, authorities often fail to respond to the kidnappings. In Chechnya, the police failure to respond to bridal kidnappings is compounded by a prevalence of abductions in the region. Several such kidnappings have been captured on video.

Researchers and non-profit organisations describe a rise in bride kidnappings in the North Caucasus in the latter half of the 20th century. In Chechnya, women's rights organisations tie the increase in kidnappings to a deterioration of women's rights under the rule of Chechen president Ramzan Kadyrov.

Azerbaijan 

In Azerbaijan, both marriage by capture (qız qaçırmaq) and elopement (qoşulub qaçmaq) are relatively common practices. In the Azeri kidnap custom, a young woman is taken to the home of the abductor's parents through either deceit or force. Regardless of whether rape occurs or not, the woman is generally regarded as impure by her relatives, and is therefore forced to marry her abductor. Despite a 2005 Azeri law that criminalised bride kidnapping, the practice places women in extremely vulnerable social circumstances, in a country where spousal abuse is rampant and recourse to law enforcement for domestic matters is impossible. In Azerbaijan, women abducted by bride kidnapping sometimes become slaves of the family who kidnap them.

Georgia 
In Georgia, bride kidnapping occurs in the south of the country mostly concentrated in and around the town of Akhalkalaki ethnic minority areas. Although the extent of the problem is not known, non-governmental activists estimate that hundreds of women are kidnapped and forced to marry each year. In a typical Georgian model of bride kidnapping, the abductor, often accompanied by friends, accosts the intended bride, and coerces her through deception or force to enter a car. Once in the car, the victim may be taken to a remote area or the captor's home. These kidnappings sometimes include rape, and may result in strong stigma to the female victim, who is assumed to have engaged in sexual relations with her captor. Women who have been victims of bride kidnapping are often regarded with shame; the victim's relatives may view it as a disgrace if the woman returns home after a kidnapping. In other cases, the kidnapping is a consensual elopement. Human Rights Watch reports that prosecutors often refuse to bring charges against the kidnappers, urging the kidnap victim to reconcile with her aggressor. Enforcing the appropriate laws in this regard may also be a problem because the kidnapping cases often go unreported as a result of intimidation of victims and their families.

Europe

Roma (Romani) communities
Bride kidnapping has been documented as a marital practice in some Romani community traditions. In the Romani culture, girls as young as twelve years old may be kidnapped for marriage to teenaged boys. As the Roma population lives throughout Europe, this practice has been seen on multiple occasions in Ireland, England, the Czech Republic, the Netherlands, Bulgaria and Slovakia. The kidnapping has been theorized as a way to avoid a bride price or as a method of ensuring exogamy. The tradition's normalization of kidnapping puts young women at higher risk of becoming victims of human trafficking.

Mediterranean

Marriage by capture was practiced in ancient cultures throughout the Mediterranean area. It is represented in mythology and history by the tribe of Benjamin in the Bible; by the Greek hero Paris stealing the beautiful Helen of Troy from her husband Menelaus, thus triggering the Trojan War; and by the Rape of the Sabine Women by Romulus, the founder of Rome.

In 326 A.D., the Emperor Constantine issued an edict prohibiting marriage by abduction. The law made kidnapping a public offence; even the kidnapped bride could be punished if she later consented to a marriage with her abductor. Spurned suitors sometimes kidnapped their intended brides as a method of restoring honor. The suitor, in coordination with his friends, generally abducted his bride while she was out of her house in the course of her daily chores. The bride would then be secreted outside the town or village. Though the kidnapped woman was sometimes raped in the course of the abduction, the stain on her honor from a presumptive consummation of the marriage was sufficient to damage her marital prospects irreversibly. Sometimes, the abduction masked an elopement.

Italy
The custom of fuitina was widespread in Sicily and continental southern Italy. In 1965, this custom was brought to national attention by the case of Franca Viola, a 17-year-old abducted and raped by a local small-time criminal, with the assistance of a dozen of his friends.  When she was returned to her family after a week, she refused to marry her abductor, contrary to local expectation.  Her family backed her up, and suffered severe intimidation for their efforts; the kidnappers were arrested and the main perpetrator was sentenced to 11 years in prison.

The exposure of this "archaic and intransigent system of values and behavioural mores" caused great national debate. In 1968, Franca married her childhood sweetheart, with whom she would later have three children. Conveying clear messages of solidarity, Giuseppe Saragat, then president of Italy, sent the couple a gift on their wedding day, and soon afterwards, Pope Paul VI granted them a private audience. A 1970 film, La moglie più bella (The Most Beautiful Wife) by Damiano Damiani and starring Ornella Muti, is based on the case. Viola never capitalised on her fame and status as a feminist icon, preferring to live a quiet life in Alcamo with her family.

The law allowing "rehabilitating marriages" (also known as marry-your-rapist law) to protect rapists from criminal proceedings was abolished in 1981.

Ireland
The 12th-century Norman invasion of Ireland was invited by an instance of wife-stealing: in 1167, the King of Leinster, Diarmait Mac Murchada, had his lands and kingship revoked by order of the High King of Ireland, Ruaidrí Ua Conchobair, as punishment for abducting the wife of another king in 1152. This led Diarmait to seek the assistance of King Henry II of England in order to reclaim his kingdom.

The abduction of heiresses was an occasional feature in Ireland until 1800, as illustrated in the film The Abduction Club.

Malta
In 2015, Malta was criticized by Equality Now, for a law which, in certain circumstances, can extinguish the punishment for a man who abducts a woman if, following the abduction, the man and woman get married. (Article 199 and Article 200 of the Criminal Code of Malta) The article was ultimately abolished by Act XIII of 2018, Article 24.

Slavic tribes

East Slavic tribes, predecessor tribes to the Rus state, practiced bride kidnapping in the eleventh century. The traditions were documented by Rus' monk Nestor. According to his Chronicles, the Drevlian tribe captured wives non-consensually, whereas the Radimich, Viatich, and Severian tribes "captured" their wives after having come to an agreement about marriage with them. The clergy's increase in influence may have helped the custom to abate.

Marriage by capture occurred among the South Slavs until the beginning of the 1800s. Common in Serbia, Montenegro, Croatia and Bosnia-Herzegovina, the custom was known as otmitza. The practice was mentioned in a statute in the Politza, the 1605 Croatian legal code. According to Serbian folk-chronicler Vuk Karadzic, a man would dress for "battle" before capturing a woman. Physical force was a frequent element of these kidnappings.

Bride kidnapping was also a custom in Bulgaria. With the consent of his parents and the aid of his friends, the abductor would accost his bride and take her to a barn away from the home, as superstition held that pre-marital intercourse might bring bad luck to the house. Whether or not the man raped his bride, the abduction would shame the girl and force her to stay with her kidnapper to keep her reputation. As in other cultures, sometimes couples would elope by staging false kidnappings to secure the parents' consent.

In religion

Catholic law
In Catholic canon law, the impediment of raptus specifically prohibits marriage between a woman abducted with the intent to force her to marry, and her abductor, as long as the woman remains in the abductor's power. According to the second provision of the law, should the woman decide to accept the abductor as a husband after she is safe, she will be allowed to marry him. The canon defines raptus as a "violent" abduction, accompanied by physical violence or threats, or fraud or deceit. The Council of Trent insisted that the abduction in raptus must be for the purpose of marriage to count as an impediment to marriage.

In film

Features

Bride capture has been reflected in feature films from many cultures, sometimes humorously, sometimes as social commentary.

Bride kidnapping is depicted as an American frontier solution in the 1954 Hollywood musical Seven Brides for Seven Brothers. Stephen Vincent Benét wrote a short story called "The Sobbin' Women" that parodied the legend of the rape of the Sabine women. The short story, and then the film, focus on seven gauche but sincere backwoodsmen, one of whom gets married and encourages the others to seek partners. After a social where they meet girls they are attracted to, they are denied the chance to pursue their courtship by the latter's menfolk. Following the Roman example, they abduct the girls. As in the original tale, the women are at first indignant but are eventually won over.

The 1960 Hong Kong film Qiangpin (The Bride Hunter) portrays the custom in the format of an all-female Yue opera comedy, in which Xia Meng plays a gender-bending role as a man masquerading as a woman. Bride kidnapping is displayed somewhat humorously in Pedro Almodóvar's 1990 Spanish hit ¡Átame! (Tie Me Up! Tie Me Down!), starring Antonio Banderas and Victoria Abril.  It is the underlying theme behind the 2005 Korean movie The Bow.  In the 2006 comedy Borat: Cultural Learnings of America for Make Benefit Glorious Nation of Kazakhstan, the eponymous fictional reporter Borat, played by British comedian/satirist Sacha Baron Cohen, attempts to kidnap Canadian actress Pamela Anderson in order to take her as his wife. He brings a "wedding sack" which he has made for the occasion, suggesting that such kidnappings are a tradition in his parody of Kazakhstan.

On a more serious note, a 1970 Italian film, La moglie più bella (The Most Beautiful Wife) by Damiano Damiani and starring Ornella Muti, is based on the story of Franca Viola, described above.  However, before the national debate caused by the Viola case, a 1964 satire directed by Pietro Germi, Seduced and Abandoned (Sedotta e abbandonata), treated the Sicilian custom as a dark comedy. The 2009 film Baarìa - la porta del vento shows a consensual fuitina in 20th-century Sicily (atypically having the couple enclosed in the girl's house) as the only way the lovers can avoid the girl's arranged marriage to a richer man.

Some Russian films and literature depict bride kidnapping in the Caucasus.  There is a Soviet comedy entitled Kidnapping, Caucasian Style (literally translated as The Girl Prisoner of the Caucasus), where a bride kidnapping occurs in an unidentified Caucasian country. The 2007 Kyrgyz film Pure Coolness also revolves around the bride kidnapping custom, mistaken identity, and the clash between modern urban expectations and the more traditional countryside.

Documentaries
In 2005, a documentary film entitled Bride Kidnapping in Kyrgyzstan made by Petr Lom was presented at the United Nations Association Film Festival, and subsequently on PBS and Investigation Discovery (ID) in the United States. The film met controversy in Kyrgyzstan because of ethical concerns about the filming of real kidnappings.

In 2012, the website Vice.com did a full documentary film about bride kidnapping in Kyrgyzstan.

In literature

The millennia-old Srimad Bhavata Purana refers to "riksasa", the ritual kidnapping of the bride:  Young Rukmini, "beautiful-eyed" and "with an exquisite waist", did not want the marriage arranged for her to Sisupala, the king of the Cedis, so she arranged to be abducted by Krishna.  After he carried her away Krishna married Rukmini "according to the appropriate rights" amid the great joy of the citizens of Dvaraka.  [144]

In Frances Burney's novel, Camilla (1796), the heroine's sister, Eugenia, is kidnapped by an adventurer called Alphonso Bellamy. Eugenia decides to stay with her husband on the grounds that she believes her word is a solemn oath. Eugenia is fifteen years old, and so underage, and is coerced into the marriage—both were grounds for treating the marriage as illegal.

A Sherlock Holmes story features bride kidnapping. In "The Adventure of the Solitary Cyclist" (1903), a woman is employed as a governess by a man who knows that she will soon inherit a fortune, with the intent of a confederate marrying her. The ceremony does eventually occur, but is void.

The manga Otoyomegatari A Bride's Story takes place in central Asia. The heroine is married to a boy in an outside clan, but regrets regarding this decision occur when her original clan has problems bearing heirs. Her birth family comes to retrieve her with the intention of marrying her to someone else, but without success.  Her new family tells the invaders that the girl has been impregnated, which would be the last seal on the marriage.  They doubt this has occurred as the groom is very young and, desperate, they resort to a kidnap attempt, but again fail.

The fantasy novel A Storm of Swords features marriage by capture (or "stealing a woman") as the traditional form of marriage north of the Wall. The Free Folk consider it a test for a man to "steal" a wife and outwit her attempts on his life long enough for her to respect his strength and come to love him. More often, though, marriages by capture are conducted between a couple already in love, an elopement without the extra element of attempted murder. Jon Snow and Ygritte have such a marriage by capture, although at the time Jon was ignorant of the custom and thought he was merely taking her prisoner. The Ironborn are also known to practice this custom, taking secondary wives while reaving the mainland, which they refer to as "salt wives".

The Tamora Pierce fantasy novel The Will of the Empress includes bride kidnapping as a major plot point and has extensive discussions of the morality of bride kidnapping. Multiple characters are kidnapped for the purpose of marriage during the novel, which is used as a warning against it (in keeping with the women's rights focus of her series), particularly in the case of poor women or those without social support systems.

In television
In the BBC radio and television comedy series The League of Gentlemen, the character Papa Lazarou comes to the fictional town of Royston Vasey under the guise of a peg-seller. He seeks to kidnap women by entering their homes, talking gibberish to them (Gippog) and persuading them to hand over their wedding rings. He 'names' them all 'Dave', and, after obtaining their rings, proclaims;  "you're my wife now".
In Criminal Minds, season 4, episode 13 titled "Bloodline" depicts bride kidnapping.

See also 

 Bride price
 Bride burning
 Charivari
 Exchange of women
 Groom kidnapping
 History of rape
 Honour killing
 Shotgun wedding, a sudden wedding, often because the bride is pregnant
 Stockholm syndrome, when a captive grows to identify with their captor

Bibliography

Books 
 Adekunle, Julius.  Culture and Customs of Rwanda, Greenwood Publishing Group (2007).
 Kovalesky, Maxime.  Modern Customs and Ancient Laws of Russia, London: David, Nutt & Strand (1891).
 Pamporov, Alexey.  Romani everyday life in Bulgaria Sofia: IMIR (2006). (in Bulgarian)

Journal articles 

 Ayres, Barbara  "Bride Theft and Raiding for Wives in Cross-Cultural Perspective", Anthropological Quarterly, Vol. 47, No. 3, Kidnapping and Elopement as Alternative Systems of Marriage (Special Issue) (July 1974), p. 245
Barnes, R. H.  "Marriage by Capture."  The Journal of the Royal Anthropological Institute, Vol. 5, No. 1. (March 1999), pp. 57–73.
Bates, Daniel G.  "Normative and Alternative Systems of Marriage among the Yörük of Southeastern Turkey."  Anthropological Quarterly, 47:3 (Jul. 1974), pp. 270–287.
Evans-Grubbs, Judith. "Abduction Marriage in Antiquity: A Law of Constantine (CTh IX. 24. I) and Its Social Context" The Journal of Roman Studies, Vol. 79, 1989, pp. 59–83.
Handrahan, Lori. 2004. "Hunting for Women: Bride-Kidnapping in Kyrgyzstan." International Feminist Journal of Politics, 6:2 (June), 207–233.
Herzfeld, Michael "Gender Pragmatics: Agency, Speech, and Bride Theft in a Cretan Mountain Village." Anthropology 1985, Vol. IX: 25–44.
Kleinbach, Russ and Salimjanova, Lilly (2007). "Kyz ala kachuu and adat: non-consensual bride kidnapping and tradition in Kyrgyzstan", Central Asian Survey, 26:2, 217–233.
Kleinbach, Russell.  "Frequency of non-consensual bride kidnapping in the Kyrgyz Republic." International Journal of Central Asian Studies. Vol 8, No 1, 2003, pp. 108–128.
Kleinbach, Russell, Mehrigiul Ablezova and Medina Aitieva. "Kidnapping for marriage (ala kachuu) in a Kyrgyz village." Central Asian Survey.
Kowalewsky, M. "Marriage among the Early Slavs", Folklore, Vol. 1, No. 4 (Dec. 1890), pp. 463–480.
Light, Nathan and Damira Imanalieva. "Performing Ala Kachuu: Marriage Strategies in the Kyrgyz Republic".
McLaren, Anne E., "Marriage by Abduction in Twentieth Century China", Modern Asian Studies 35(4) (Oct. 2001), pp. 953–984.
Pamporov, Alexey "Sold like a donkey? Bride-price among the Bulgarian Roma" Journal of the Royal Anthropological Institute (N.S.) 13, 471–476 (2007)
Rimonte, Nilda  "A Question of Culture: Cultural Approval of Violence against Women in the Pacific-Asian Community and the Cultural Defense'", Stanford Law Review, Vol. 43, No. 6 (Jul. 1991), pp. 1311–1326.
Stross, Brian. "Tzeltal Marriage by Capture."  Anthropological Quarterly. 47:3 (July 1974), pp. 328–346.
Werner, Cynthia, "Women, marriage, and the nation-state: the rise of nonconsensual bride kidnapping in post-Soviet Kazakhstan", in The Transformation of Central Asia. Pauline Jones Luong, ed.  Ithaca, New York: Cornell University Press, 2004, pp. 59–89.
Yang, Jennifer Ann.  "Marriage By Capture in the Hmong Culture: The Legal Issue of Cultural Rights Versus Women's Rights", Law and Society Review at UCSB, Vol. 3, pp. 38–49 (2004).

Human rights reports 

Amnesty International, Georgia—Thousands Suffering in Silence: Violence Against Women in the Family , AI Index: EUR 56/009/2006, September 2006 (last accessed 18 August 2011).
 Georgian Young Lawyers' Association & OMCT, Violence Against Women in Georgia: Report submitted on the occasion of the 36th session of the UN Committee on the Elimination of Discrimination Against Women, August 2006 (last accessed 18 August 2011).
 Human Rights Watch, Reconciled to Violence: State Failure to Stop Domestic Abuse and Abduction of Women in Kyrgyzstan, Vol. 8, No. 9, September 2006 (last accessed 28 January 2009).
 Ireland: Refugee Documentation Centre, "Georgia: Bride-kidnapping in Georgia", 8 June 2009 (last accessed 18 August 2011).
Pusurmankulova, Burulai, "Bride Kidnapping.  Benign Custom Or Savage Tradition?", Freedom House, 14 June 2004 (last accessed 18 August 2011).
 U.S. Department of State, Rwanda: Country Reports on Human Rights Practices – 2007, 11 March 2008 (last accessed 28 January 2009).
 OSCE, Building the Capacity of Roma Communities to Prevent Trafficking in Human Beings, 12 June 2007, (last accessed 9 March 2012).

News articles and radio reports 

 Aminova, Alena   "Uzbekistan: No Love Lost in Karakalpak Bride Thefts", Institute of War and Peace Reporting, 14 June 2004
 Armstrong, Jane,  "Rage or Romance?" , Globe and Mail (Canada), 26 April 2008
 BBC, "Ethiopia: Revenge of the Abducted Bride", 18 June 1999
 Brooks, Courtney & Amina Umarova, "Despite Official Measures, Bride Kidnapping Endemic in Chechnya", Radio Free Europe, 21 October 2010
 Kokhodze, Gulo & Tamuna Uchidze, "Bride Theft Rampant in Southern Georgia", Institute of War and Peace Reporting, 15 June 2006
 Najibullah, Farangis, "Bride Kidnapping: A Tradition or a Crime?", Radio Free Europe, 21 May 2011
 Isayev, Ruslan,  "In Chechnya, Attempts to Eradicate Bride Abduction", Prague Watchdog, 16 November 2007
 Kiryashova, Sabina,  "Azeri Bride Kidnappers Risk Heavy Sentences", Institute of War and Peace Reporting, 17 November 2005
 McDonald, Henry,  "Gardai Hunt Gang Accused of Seizing Roma Child Bride", The Guardian, UK, 3 September 2007
 NPR Weekend Edition Sunday, "Kidnapping Custom Makes a Comeback in Georgia", 14 May 2006
 Rakhimdinova, Aijan,  "Kyrgyz Bride Price Controversy", Institute of War and Peace Reporting, 22 December 2005
 Rodriguez, Alex, "Kidnapping a Bride Practice Embraced in Kyrgyzstan", Augusta Chronicle, 24 July 2005
 Ruremesha, Jean, "RIGHTS-RWANDA: Marriage by Abduction Worries Women's Groups", Inter Press Service, 7 October 2003
 Smith, Craig S., "Abduction, Often Violent, a Kyrgyz Wedding Rite", NY Times, 30 April 2005

Dissertations and academic papers

 Moua, Teng, "The Hmong Culture: Kinship, Marriage & Family Systems", University of Wisconsin–Stout (May 2003)
Pamporov, Alexey, Roma/Gypsy Population in Bulgaria as a Challenge to Policy Relevance (2006)

References

144.  Srimad Bhavata Purana Book X, Penguin Books 2003

External links

 The Kidnapped Bride: A documentary by Petr Lom
 Dedicated to Understanding Ala Kachuu (bride-kidnapping in Kyrgyzstan) and Preventing Non-Consensual Marriage
 Spotlight on: Violence Against Girls in Ethiopia – Marriage by Abduction and Rape
 Rights-Rwanda: Marriage by Abduction Worries Women's Groups
 Article on the kidnap of a young girl for marriage in Kyrgyzstan
 BBC documentary about stolen brides in Chechnya Aired August 2010.
 Captured Hearts: An epidemic of bride kidnappings may at last be waning in Kyrgyzstan  - National Geographic, Paul Salopek

Central Asian culture
Marriage, unions and partnerships in Turkmenistan
Marriage, unions and partnerships in Kyrgyzstan
Marriage, unions and partnerships in Georgia (country)
Marriage, unions and partnerships in India
Kidnapping
Marriage
Violence against women
Women's rights in Asia
Women's rights in Africa
Culture of the Caucasus
North Caucasus
Human trafficking
Forced marriage